Michiel Frederick Bothma (born 13 March 1973) is a South African professional golfer.

Bothma was born in Pretoria. He turned professional in 1993 and he has played predominantly on the Southern Africa Sunshine Tour. He won for the first time in 2002 at the Telkom PGA Championship, one of the most prestigious tournaments in South Africa. In 2010 he won the PGA Championship for the second time.

Professional wins (6)

Sunshine Tour wins (4)

Sunshine Tour playoff record (2–0)

Challenge Tour wins (1)

IGT Pro Tour wins (1)

External links

South African male golfers
Sunshine Tour golfers
European Tour golfers
Sportspeople from Pretoria
White South African people
1973 births
Living people